Perry Township is in Pike County, Illinois. At the 2010 census, its population was 594 and it contained 310 housing units.

Geography

Demographics

References

External links
City-data.com
Illinois State Archives, Pike County Fact Sheet

Townships in Pike County, Illinois
Townships in Illinois